Selam Amha (born 3 September 1997) is an Ethiopian cyclist. She competed in the women's road race event at the 2020 Summer Olympics.

References

External links
 

1997 births
Living people
Ethiopian female cyclists
Olympic cyclists of Ethiopia
Cyclists at the 2020 Summer Olympics
Place of birth missing (living people)